The 1976–77 New York Knicks season was the 31st season for the team in the National Basketball Association (NBA). In the regular season, the Knicks finished in third place in the Atlantic Division, and failed to qualify for the 1977 NBA Playoffs. Bob McAdoo, a mid-season trade acquisition, led the Knicks in points per game (26.7) and rebounds per game (12.7), while Walt Frazier had a team-high 5.3 assists per game.

In the 1976 NBA draft, New York did not have a first-round pick, having been stripped of it in 1975 after attempting to sign American Basketball Association player George McGinnis, whose NBA rights were held by the Philadelphia 76ers. With their first selection, the Knicks chose Lonnie Shelton in the second round with the 25th overall pick. On November 30, 1976, the Knicks played their first game against the New York Nets in the regular season, losing 104–103. In December, the Knicks traded with the Buffalo Braves for McAdoo and Tom McMillen, sending John Gianelli and $3 million. McAdoo started in the 1977 NBA All-Star Game, and Earl Monroe was selected as a reserve. Coach Red Holzman stepped down at the end of the 1977 season, Willis Reed was named his replacement, and Holzman accepted a role as consultant. Bill Bradley also retired after the season and started a career in politics.

Draft picks

Note: This is not an extensive list; it only covers the first and second rounds, and any other players picked by the franchise that played at least one game in the league.

Roster

Regular season

Season standings

z – clinched division title
y – clinched division title
x – clinched playoff spot

Record vs. opponents

References

New York Knicks seasons
New York Knicks
New York Knicks
New York Knicks
1970s in Manhattan
Madison Square Garden